Campbell Brook is a river in Delaware County, New York. It flows into the East Branch Delaware River by Corbett.

References

Rivers of New York (state)
Rivers of Delaware County, New York
Tributaries of the East Branch Delaware River